Park Chul-Hyung (born 17 March 1982) is a South Korean football player who plays for UiTM F.C. in Malaysia Premier League. (formerly Jeju United and Gwangju Sangmu)

References

 

1982 births
Living people
Association football defenders
South Korean footballers
South Korean expatriate footballers
Jeju United FC players
Gimcheon Sangmu FC players
K League 1 players
Singapore Premier League players
Liga 1 (Indonesia) players
Expatriate footballers in Singapore
South Korean expatriate sportspeople in Singapore
Expatriate footballers in Indonesia
South Korean expatriate sportspeople in Indonesia
Gresik United players
Sportspeople from Ulsan